Cellulosibacter is an obligately anaerobic, cellulolytic and xylanolytic bacterial genus from the family of Clostridiaceae with one known species (Cellulosibacter alkalithermophilus).

References

Clostridiaceae
Bacteria genera
Monotypic bacteria genera